Dragutin Inkiostri-Medenjak (1866–1942) was a Serbian painter, collector of folk ornaments and handicrafts, and is considered the first interior designer in Serbia. In 1912, he was put in charge of designing the interior of the House of Vuk's Foundation.

He was born in Leskovac as Dragutin Medenica. After settling down in Belgrade, he changed his name to Srbinda and added his mother's surname. Following studies in Florence, he travelled through Serbia and the rest of Yugoslavia. Inkiostri Medenjak wrote his chief work Moja teorija o dekorativnoj srpskoj umetnosti i njenoj primeni in 1925.

Gallery

See also
 List of painters from Serbia

References

Further reading

1866 births
1942 deaths
20th-century Serbian people
19th-century Serbian people
Serbian painters
Decorative arts
Artists from Belgrade
Artists from Split, Croatia